Apple stem pitting virus is a plant pathogenic virus of the family Betaflexiviridae. A number of hosts are in the genus Malus (apples).

External links
 ICTVdB - The Universal Virus Database: Apple stem pitting virus
 Family Groups - The Baltimore Method

Betaflexiviridae
Viral plant pathogens and diseases